The Luzon water redstart (Phoenicurus bicolor), also known as the Luzon redstart, is a species of bird in the family Muscicapidae.
It is endemic to the Philippines found primarily on Luzon with no records in Mindoro since 1965. Its natural habitats are tropical moist lowland forest, subtropical or tropical moist montane forest, and rivers.
It is threatened by habitat loss.

This species was formerly placed in the genus Rhyacornis but was moved to Phoenicurus based on the results of a molecular phylogenetic study published in 2010.

Description 
EBird describes the bird as "A fairly small bird of fast-flowing streams through foothill and montane forest or scrub. Slaty-blue with a rufous belly and tail. Female is a duller version of the male. Somewhat similar in color to Blue-headed Fantail, but has a shorter tail and is usually restricted to streams. Also similar to Blue Rock-Thrush, but smaller, with a dark tail. Song is a slightly ascending series of notes run together to sound like a quavering whistle."

They exhibit sexual dimorphism which males have the red belly and vents with the females having a plainer and more uniform blue plumage.

Its primary diet includes small invertebrates.

Habitat and Conservation Status 
It inhabits the sides of clean, fast-flowing  mountain streams and rivers, above 300 m. Adjacent habitat includes tropical montane forest, pine forest or just scrub and scattered trees. Records from Dalton Pass between August and December indicate that some birds wander post-breeding.

IUCN has assessed this bird as near-threatened  with the population estimated at 2,500 to 9,999 mature individuals and continuing to decline. Its main threat is habitat degradation caused by pollution of its streams through mining and dumping of trash and agro-chemicals. It is also affected by legal and illegal logging and conversion of forest into farmland.

It occurs in a few protected areas such as Northern Sierra Madre Natural Park, Maria Aurora National Park, Balbalasang-Balbalan National Park, Mount Pulag National Park and Mt. Iglit-Baco National Park (which is also the stronghold of the Tamaraw). However, as with most areas in the Philippines, protection from hunting and illegal logging is lax.

Conservation actions proposed include  surveys of suitable mountain streams to clarify its distribution, population status and the influence of pollution and siltation on population. Research its ecological requirements and seasonal movements to facilitate conservation planning. Propose formal protection for other key sites. Stricted enforcement on controlling river pollution, mining and logging.  Monitor water quality and habitat conditions in areas downstream of mining operations. Campaign for a ban on mining in key areas for this species.

References 

Luzon water redstart
Birds of Luzon
Luzon water redstart
Taxonomy articles created by Polbot